The 2006–07 Four Hills Tournament was a series of ski jumping competitions held in the traditional venues of Oberstdorf, Garmisch-Partenkirchen, Innsbruck and Bischofshofen, located in Germany and Austria. The tournament was part of the 2006–07 Ski Jumping World Cup and points scored in each of the four competitions also counted towards the World Cup rankings. Before the tournament started on 28 December 2006 the World Cup leader was Simon Ammann.

Norwegian Anders Jacobsen won the tournament, after finishing on the podium in both hills in Austria and never finishing worse than fifth on any of the four hills. He thus became the first debutant since Toni Nieminen in 1991–92 to win the tournament. Gregor Schlierenzauer, who turned 17 on the day of the final event in Bischofshofen, won the first and last event, but finished over 15 points behind after 11th place in Innsbruck.

Tournament review

Results are listed for the top 15 skiers, as well as skiers among the top six in the overall World Cup before the tournament, former overall World Cup winners, former Four Hills Tournament winners, former world record holders, and former World or Olympic champions.

Oberstdorf, 30 December 2006

Austrian junior world champion and newcomer Gregor Schlierenzauer, who with his 16 years of age was one of the key factors and surprises of the pre season also excelled in the first day of the Four Hills Tournament. His first jump of the day (135.5 metres) was the furthest jump in competition, with only World Cup leader Simon Ammann and Martin Koch able to finish 0.5 metres short. While Andreas Küttel set a new record for the day in the second jump when he reached a distance of 136.5 metres Schlierenzauer again showed his skills and his capability of keeping his nerves in control when he jumped 142.0 metres, just 1.5 metres short to equalise the hill record set by Sigurd Pettersen in 2003. Switzerland's Andreas Küttel claimed the second position, but trailed by 9.5 points, while Adam Małysz of Poland finished in third position, 6.2 points behind Küttel. The win was Schlierenzauer's third win in five World Cup meetings. 2005–06 shared winners Janne Ahonen and Jakub Janda only finished in seventh and 21st position respectively, while Olympic champion Thomas Morgenstern just reached a top 10 ranking. With his win Schlierenzauer not only took the lead in the Four Hills Tournament, but he also overtook Ammann to lead the overall World Cup.

Garmisch-Partenkirchen, 1 January 2007

In windy and rainy conditions, the New Year's Day ski jumping (Neujahrsskispringen) was cancelled after one jump. Noriaki Kasai, who failed to qualify for the event in Oberstdorf, finished third here after having the longest jump, but without a Telemark landing he was docked style points and finished third. Andreas Küttel won the event, and is now three points behind Schlierenzauer in the overall standings. Following Małysz' 12th place and Ammann's 16th place, Jacobsen advanced to third in the overall standings and second in the World Cup standings despite not having finished on the podium thus far in the Four Hills.

Innsbruck, 4 January 2007

With neither Küttel nor Schlierenzauer able to make it past 123 metres in either leap, they lost plenty of points to winner Jacobsen, who won his second World Cup event of his career. He gained 38 points on Schlierenzauer, and went from third place to a ten-point lead, ahead of Finland's Lappi who finished fourth in the race. Schlierenzauer fell six places in the overall Four Hills standings, but remained within 20 points, or 11 metres, of Jacobsen.

Norway called up Olympic champion and last year's Innsbruck winner, Lars Bystøl, to represent them in the Innsbruck event. However, Bystøl failed to qualify.

Bischofshofen, 7 January 2007

Gregor Schlierenzauer took his fourth World Cup win on his seventeenth birthday, but it wasn't enough to beat Jacobsen in the overall standings; despite having won two events to Jacobsen's one, Schlierenzauer had to be content with second place overall in the Four Hills tournament.

See also
 2007 in ski jumping
 2006–07 Ski Jumping World Cup

References
 Oberstdorf results, from fis-ski.com
 Garmisch-Partenkirchen results, from fis-ski.com
 Innsbruck results, from fis-ski.com
 Bischofshofen results, from fis-ski.com

Further references and notes

Four Hills Tournament
Four Hills Tournament
Four Hills Tournament
Four Hills Tournament
Four Hills Tournament
Four Hills Tournament